The 2007 Pattaya Women's Open was a tennis tournament played on hard courts. It was the 16th edition of the PTT Pattaya Open, and was part of the WTA Tier IV tournaments of the 2007 WTA Tour. It was held in Pattaya, Thailand, from 5 February through 12 February 2007.

Points and prize money

Point distribution

Prize money 
* per team

Singles main draw entrants

Seeds

Other entrants 

The following players received wildcards into the singles main draw:
  Montinee Tangphong
  Olga Savchuk
  Alicia Molik

The following players received entry from the qualifying draw:
  Andreja Klepač
  Tzipora Obziler
  Noppawan Lertcheewakarn
  Yuan Meng

Retirements 
  Alicia Molik (right hamstring)

Doubles main draw entrants

Seeds

Other entrants 
The following pairs received wildcards into the doubles main draw:
  Martina Suchá /  Napaporn Tongsalee

Retirements 
  Peng Shuai

Champions

Singles 

 Sybille Bammer def.  Gisela Dulko, 7–5, 3–6, 7–5

Doubles 

 Nicole Pratt /  Mara Santangelo def.  Chan Yung-jan /  Chuang Chia-jung, 6–4, 7–6(7–4)

References

External links 
 Pattaya Women's Open website
 Singles Main and Qualifying Draws, Doubles Main Draw

2007